This article shows the statistical leaders of the Mississippi State Bulldogs men's basketball team. For Mississippi State's women's basketball statistical leaders, see Mississippi State Bulldogs women's basketball statistical leaders.

The Mississippi State Bulldogs men's basketball statistical leaders are individual statistical leaders of the Mississippi State Bulldogs men's basketball program in various categories, including points, three-pointers, assists, blocks, rebounds, and steals. Within those areas, the lists identify single-game, single-season, and career leaders. The Bulldogs represent Mississippi State University in the NCAA's Southeastern Conference.

Mississippi State began competing in intercollegiate basketball in 1908,. However, the school's record book does not generally list records from before the 1950s, as records from before this period are often incomplete and inconsistent. Since scoring was much lower in this era, and teams played much fewer games during a typical season, it is likely that few or no players from this era would appear on these lists anyway.

The NCAA did not officially record assists as a stat until the 1983-84 season, and blocks and steals until the 1985-86 season, but Mississippi State's record books includes players in these stats before these seasons. These lists are updated through the end of the 2022–23 season.

Scoring

Assists

Blocks

Rebounds

Steals

See also
 Mississippi State Bulldogs football statistical leaders
 Mississippi State Bulldogs women's basketball statistical leaders

References

Statistical
Mississippi State